York Township is one of the twelve townships of Van Wert County, Ohio, United States.  The 2000 census found 788 people in the township, 650 of whom lived in the unincorporated portions of the township.

Geography
Located in the southern part of the county, it borders the following townships:
Ridge Township - north
Washington Township - northeast corner
Jennings Township - east
Union Township, Mercer County - south
Dublin Township, Mercer County - southwest corner
Liberty Township - west
Pleasant Township - northwest corner

Two villages are located in York Township: Elgin in the southeast, and part of Venedocia in the northeast, along the border with Jennings Township.

Name and history
It is one of ten York Townships statewide.

Government
The township is governed by a three-member board of trustees, who are elected in November of odd-numbered years to a four-year term beginning on the following January 1. Two are elected in the year after the presidential election and one is elected in the year before it. There is also an elected township fiscal officer, who serves a four-year term beginning on April 1 of the year after the election, which is held in November of the year before the presidential election. Vacancies in the fiscal officership or on the board of trustees are filled by the remaining trustees.

References

External links
County website

Townships in Van Wert County, Ohio
Townships in Ohio